El Alcázar (meaning The Fortress in English) was a Spanish language far-right newspaper published in Spain between 1936 and 1988.

History and profile
El Alcázar was established in 1936. The paper was founded as the principal nationalist mouthpiece during the Siege of the Alcázar in homage to the defenders of the Alcázar of Toledo. It mainly focused on military news.

During a short period which spanned from 1966 to 1968, the paper opened itself to the more moderate tendencies of the Francoist regime . However, its direction changed in 1968 and El Alcázar renewed with its support of Falangist ideology, especially after it was converted into the official newspaper of the Confederación Nacional de Ex Combatientes, organization grouping militants defending the essences of Franco's regime who fought in the Spanish Civil war, in June 1975.

Following Franco's death in November 1975 and the beginning of the transition to democracy, the newspaper became the mouthpiece of the Búnker, a group of Francoist and ultramontanist militaries and leaders opposed to democracy. Between 1977 and 1981, they published various articles from the Colectivo Almendros which publicly declared itself in favor of a coup d'état, one a short time before the 23-F attempted putsch. Following the self-dissolution of Blas Piñar's Fuerza Nueva, francoist far-right party, the newspaper published in 1983 a call for the creation of a new far-right party, materialized by the foundation of the Juntas Españolas.

The circulation of El Alcázar declined between 1970 and 1975. Its circulation was 13,119 copies in 1975, 26,724 copies in 1976, 63,646 copies in 1977 and 66,104 in 1978. The increase in its circulation continued until 1980.

El Alcázar closed in 1988 as a result of poor sales. Antonio Izquierdo served as the paper's last editor. By the end of the paper's run, circulation was primarily among Francoist veterans.

In November 1994 the Audiencia Nacional sentenced the Spanish State to pay 3 billion pesetas (€18 million) to the owners of the defunct newspaper for discriminating it from official advertising, public subscription and subsidies by socialist governments. The money was used to pay the debts that Dyrsa, company holding the header had with the Social Security, public finances and ex-workers.

Notable people
Jorge Claramunt, Jesús Evaristo Casariego, Jesús Ercilla, José Luis Cebrián, Fernando Vizcaíno Casas, Enrique Jardiel Poncela, Rafael García Serrano, José Antonio Gurriarán, Alfonso Paso, Yale.

See also
Juntas Españolas

References

1936 establishments in Spain
1988 disestablishments in Spain
Defunct newspapers published in Spain
Far-right politics in Spain

Publications established in 1936
Publications disestablished in 1988
Spanish-language newspapers
Fascist newspapers and magazines